Heather Lyke is the athletic director at the University of Pittsburgh. She was previously the athletic director and vice president at Eastern Michigan University, and has also served in administrative roles at Ohio State University and the University of Cincinnati.

Career
During her tenure at Eastern Michigan University, Lyke oversaw significant growth in the school's athletic programs thanks to a 51% increase in athletic donations. This increased funding was used for capital upgrades to athletic facilities. The school won seventeen MAC titles during her tenure. The football team made its first bowl appearance since 1987, with a 20–24 loss to Old Dominion in the 2019 Bahamas Bowl under head coach Chris Creighton.

She was announced as the athletic director for the University of Pittsburgh in March 2017 following the departure of Scott Barnes.

References

External links
Pittsburgh Panthers bio

Living people
Eastern Michigan Eagles athletic directors
Michigan Wolverines softball players
Pittsburgh Panthers athletic directors
Sportspeople from Canton, Ohio
Women college athletic directors in the United States
University of Akron alumni
1970 births